Oyem Solar Power Station, is a planned  solar power plant in Gabon. The power station is under development by Amea Power, a subsidiary of the Al Nowais Investments (ANI), based in the United Arab Emirates.

Location
The power station would be located  outside the city centre of Oyem, the provincial capital of Woleu-Ntem Province, in the north of the county.

Overview
According to USAID, Gabon had an overall electrification rate of 89 percent (38 percent rural and 97 percent urban), as of 2016. As of then, national installed capacity was 443 megawatts, with 60 percent of the total coming from thermal fossil-fuel sources and 40 percent from renewable sources. As of 2019, installed national capacity had increased to 750 megawatts, with more than 50 percent derived from fossil-fuels.

It is the objective of the Gabonese government to reduce dependence on fossil-fuels for its electricity needs and to increase the number of renewable energy sources and the quantity of electricity derived therefrom. Oyem Solar Farm helps to satisfy this objective. This power station is intended to supply energy to Woleu-Ntem Province where it is based and to neighboring Ogooué-Ivindo Province.

Developers
The power station is being developed by AMEA Power, an independent power producer (IPP), based in the United Arab Emirates, and is active in Africa. AMEA Power also owns and operates Blitta Solar Power Station (50 megawatts), in Togo.

See also

 List of power stations in Gabon
 Ayémé Solar Power Station

References

External links
 Website of AMEA Power LLC

Woleu-Ntem Province
Power stations in Gabon
Solar power stations in Gabon
Proposed solar power stations in Gabon